The Midland Library is a branch of the Multnomah County Library, in Portland in the U.S. state of Oregon. The branch offers the Multnomah County Library catalog of two million books, periodicals and other materials.

History
Bookmobiles, reading rooms, and small branch libraries provided much of the public library service to Portland neighborhoods in the first half of the 20th century. A library study in 1955 recommended switching to a system of larger branches supported by sub-branches and bookmobiles. 

The large Midland branch opened at S.E. 122nd Avenue and S.E. Morrison Street in 1958 and was the second branch in the county system to serve suburban residents. Oregon authors present at its dedication included Stewart Holbrook, Dorothy Johansen, and others. The  building cost $90,000; it initially housed 12,000 volumes, with plans to extend the collection to 20,000. The building offered bicycle racks.

Until the 1990 opening of the new Gresham Library building (13 times the size of the building it replaced), the Midland was considered the second busiest in the county system, after Portland's Central Library. In 1993, Multnomah County voters agreed to spend $5.3 million for a new Midland Library building at the same site along S.E. 122nd Avenue. Thomas Hacker and Associates was the architectural firm for the project and Silco Construction the general contractor. The new library opened on September 16, 1996.

See also

 History of libraries
 Library science

References

External links
 Midland Library, Multnomah County Library

1958 establishments in Oregon
Libraries established in 1958
Libraries in Portland, Oregon
Library buildings completed in 1958
Library buildings completed in 1996
Multnomah County Library
Southeast Portland, Oregon